Troy Taylor (born 28 February 1984 in the Cayman Islands) is a cricketer. A right-handed batsman and right-arm medium-fast bowler, he has played for the Cayman Islands national cricket team since 2005, having previously represented them at Under-19 level.

Career
Taylor's first taste of international cricket came as part of the 2003 Americas Under-19 Championship in King City, Ontario, where he was the leading wicket-taker. He won the man of the match award after taking 7/12 against Bermuda, which was at the time a tournament record. Taylor made his senior debut in the repêchage tournament for the 2005 ICC Trophy, against Fiji.

He made his first-class debut in the 2005 ICC Intercontinental Cup, playing against Bermuda and Canada at the Toronto Cricket, Skating and Curling Club. He next played for the Cayman Islands in the ICC Americas Championship in King City in August 2006, and hasn't played for them since, though he was in their squad for Division Three of the World Cricket League in Darwin, Australia in 2007.

In August 2019, he was named in the Cayman Islands cricket team's Twenty20 International (T20I) squad for the Regional Finals of the 2018–19 ICC T20 World Cup Americas Qualifier tournament. He made his T20I debut for the Cayman Islands against Canada on 18 August 2019.

References

1984 births
Living people
Caymanian cricketers
Cayman Islands Twenty20 International cricketers